The Great Himalayas or Greater Himalayas or Himadri is the highest mountain range of the Himalayan Range. The world's highest peak, Mount Everest, as well as other "near−highest" peaks, such as Kangchenjunga, Lhotse, and Nanga Parbat, are part of the Greater Himalayas range. The total west to east extension of the Great Himalayas is 2400 km (1500 miles) and their average elevation is 6000 m (20000 ft.). 

Several glaciers are contained within the range, including Gangotri Glacier, and Satopanth Glacier.

Political entities which have territory in this range include India, China, Nepal, Pakistan, Bhutan, and Tibet.

See also

References

G
Mountain ranges of China
Mountain ranges of India
Mountain ranges of Nepal
Mountain ranges of Tibet
Himalayas